Nord Anglia International School Al Khor, NAISAK, previously known as Compass International School, Al Khor is an international school in Al Khor, Qatar teaching the British Curriculum, including iGCSE and A level, to students aged 3 to 18 (Nursery to Sixth Form). The school was established in January 2012 and has students from 40 different nationalities.

Nord Anglia International School Al Khor is part of Nord Anglia Education, with 14,000+ employees and 75,000+ students in 83 schools across 31 countries.

The school has been accredited locally, by Qatar National Schools Accreditation (QNSA), and internationally, by British Schools Overseas (BSO) and British School of the Middle East (BSME). It is one of the main international schools in Al Khor.

Global Campus 

Nord Anglia students are connected through the Global Campus, a program which offers a wide range of activities undertaken in school, online or at destinations around the world.

Collaborations 

Nord Anglia has established collaborations with academic institutions such as Juilliard MIT, and King's College London.

In July 2017, the company partnered with UNICEF as well as the governments of Bulgaria, Argentina, and Malaysia to host an event raising awareness for the Sustainable Development Goals. Nord Anglia also participated with Juilliard, UNICEF and Sing for Hope in the High Level Political Forum on Sustainable Development in July 2019.

British international schools in Qatar
1972 establishments in Qatar
Nord Anglia Education